Hurricane Debbie was an intense and long-lived hurricane that formed during August 1969. The fifth tropical cyclone, fourth named storm, third hurricane and second major hurricane of the 1969 Atlantic hurricane season, Debbie formed on August 14 in the southern Atlantic Ocean and took a general northwesterly path until turning northward into the central Atlantic. The storm was characterized by numerous fluctuations in intensity, but it still reached winds corresponding to Category 3 status on the Saffir–Simpson scale. The hurricane bypassed the island of Bermuda to the southeast on August 22, before ultimately brushing southeastern Newfoundland with strong winds. It dissipated over the cold waters east of Greenland. Although Debbie had little effect on land, it was extensively researched and was subject to a weather modification experiment by Project Stormfury, in which it was seeded with silver iodide.

Meteorological history

A disturbance associated with a tropical wave strengthened into a tropical depression on August 14. The system had significantly organized by August 15, having intensified into a tropical storm by 00:00 UTC that day. It attained Category 1 hurricane strength on August 16 as it turned toward the northwest. It continued to mature, and at around 12:00 UTC on the next day, it achieved winds corresponding to Category 2 on the Saffir–Simpson scale. After attaining an initial peak of 105 mph (165 km/h) six hours later, Debbie oscillated in strength over the succeeding two days, weakening back to Category 1 status early on August 19.

Debbie's abrupt fluctuation in intensity may have been the result of a seeding experiment carried out on the storm in an attempt to weaken it, though posthumous assessment by the Atlantic hurricane reanalysis project determined that an eyewall replacement cycle was more likely responsible. Upon reversion to minimal hurricane force, Debbie turned more to the west, although it maintained a general northwesterly path. By later in the day, Debbie had begun to restrengthen, reaching major hurricane intensity, Category 3 on the Saffir–Simpson scale, by 18:00 UTC.

The storm then weakened as it turned northward and eventually northeastward on August 21. Gradually losing strength, Debbie passed well to the southeast of Bermuda, although it is believed that if not for the presence of nearby Hurricane Camille, which emerged into the Atlantic from the United States on August 20, Debbie would have likely ended up further west, closer to the island. Debbie mostly maintained its severity through 06:00 UTC on August 23 as it continued generally toward the northeast. By 12:00 UTC on August 23, Debbie weakened to below Category 2 status and turned northward, becoming extratropical six hours later, while still retaining winds of hurricane force. The next day, the storm's remnants—no longer bearing winds of hurricane intensity, but only gale force—skirted the southeastern tip of Newfoundland. The remnants of Debbie began to lose definition as they accelerated northeastward, while moving over increasingly cold waters. Debbie's remnants finally dissipated west of Norway on August 27.

Impact and Project Stormfury

Debbie remained predominately at sea throughout its  path, and as a result, it caused little damage. The storm had little or no impact on the island of Bermuda as it passed to the south.

Debbie was subject to an experiment called Project Stormfury, which attempted to weaken tropical cyclones by seeding them with silver iodide. The storm provided an excellent opportunity to test the underpinnings of Project Stormfury. In many ways it was the perfect storm for seeding: it did not threaten any land; it passed within range of seeding aircraft; and was intense with a distinct eye. On August 18 and again on August 20, thirteen planes flew out to the storm to monitor and seed it. On the second day, windspeeds fell by 18%. Both changes were consistent with Stormfury's working hypothesis. The results were so encouraging that "a greatly expanded research program was planned." Among other conclusions was the need for frequent seeding at close to hourly intervals. However, later studies determined that Project Stormfury likely had little or no impact on the evolution of Debbie and other storms, positing instead that natural fluctuations induced by eyewall replacement cycles were more likely to blame.

See also

1969 Atlantic hurricane season

References

External links

1969 Atlantic hurricane season
Debbie (1969)
Category 3 Atlantic hurricanes
Hurricanes in Canada